Biskupin may refer to the following places in Poland:
Biskupin, an archaeological site and reconstruction of an Iron Age settlement, in Kuyavian-Pomeranian Voivodeship (north-central Poland)
Biskupin, Lower Silesian Voivodeship (south-west Poland)
Biskupin, Lipno County in Kuyavian-Pomeranian Voivodeship (north-central Poland)
Biskupin, Żnin County in Kuyavian-Pomeranian Voivodeship (north-central Poland)